UGetMe was an interactive comedy/drama series centering on three best friends Joe, Kit and Carly and the radio station they run called "UGetMe". Written by Adrian Hewitt, Stuart Kenworthy and Steve Turner, directed by Otto Bathurst and Maddy Darrall and produced by Billy Macqueen and Maddy Darrall at Darrall Macqueen Ltd. The series was broadcast on CBBC and BBC One from 2003.

Cast

 Joe – Luke Bailey
 Kit – Kieri Kennedy
 Carly – Dominique Moore
 Ben – Josh Herdman
 Ash – Kavi Shastri
 Calvin – Reggie Yates
 Marie – Melissa Batchelor
 Luke – Peter Kelly
 Simone – Rebecca Hunter
 Mia – Alice Connor

References

External links 
 
 Darrall Macqueen Ltd

Interactive television
BBC children's television shows
Black British sitcoms